Somewhere Between Heaven and Earth is the fifth album by Cindy Bullens, recorded and released in 1999 on Artemis Records This album is a tribute to her daughter, Jessie, who died from cancer.

Track listing

"In Better Hands" 	
"The Lights of Paris" 	
"I Gotta Believe in Something" (featuring Bonnie Raitt)
"Somewhere Between Heaven and Earth" (featuring Bryan Adams)
"A Thousand Shades of Grey" 	
"Water on the Moon" (featuring Rodney Crowell)
"Boxing with God" 	
"The End of Wishful Thinking" (featuring Lucinda Williams)
"As Long as You Love" (featuring Reid Bullens-Crewe)
"Better Than I've Ever Been" (featuring Mary Ann Kennedy & Bill Lloyd)

Personnel

Cindy Bullens - acoustic guitar, harmonica, synthesizer, electric guitar, rhythm guitar, percussion, vocals
Steven Soles - acoustic guitar
George Marinelli - hi-string acoustic and electric guitars, mandolin 
David Mansfield - violin
Benmont Tench - piano, Hammond B-3 organ
Steve Conn - Wurlitzer piano, Hammond B-3 organ 
Mark Jordan - keyboards
David Santos, Michael Rhodes - bass
Greg Morrow - drums, percussion
Rock Lonow - drums
Tony Berg - electric guitar
Jeff Levine - piano, organ
Larry Hirsch - percussion
Beth Nielsen Chapman, Rodney Crowell, Mary Ann Kennedy, Bryan Adams, Bill Lloyd, Bonnie Raitt, Lucinda Williams - backing vocals
Technical
Bill McDermott - engineer
Bob Clearmountain - mixing on "In Better Hands"

References

External links
https://www.discogs.com/Cindy-Bullens-Somewhere-Between-Heaven-And-Earth/release/6601882
https://store.cdbaby.com/cd/cindybullens2
https://musicbrainz.org/release/29d7fda9-f39f-4065-9c63-cdd38caa1e79

1999 albums
Albums produced by Rodney Crowell
Albums produced by Tony Berg
Artemis Records albums